Alexander Von Wood (born March 14, 1955) is an American football coach. He is the quarterbacks and wide receivers coach at University of Delaware, a position he has held since 2018. Wood served as the head football coach at James Madison University from 1995 to 1998 and Florida A&M University from 2015 to 2017. He won two national championships as an assistant coach at the University of Miami in 1989 and 1991.

Wood played for the Iowa Hawkeyes from 1975 to 1977 as a running back and special teams player. He graduated from Iowa in 1979 with a degree in secondary education and social studies. He also began his coaching career as a student assistant at his alma mater in 1978. He has over 30 years in coaching experience at both the college and National Football League (NFL) ranks.

Personal life
Wood, from Massillon, Ohio, played football and wrestled at Massillon Washington High School. He and his wife, Rosa, have three children – Jerrel, Alex and Natalie.

Head coaching record

Notes

References

External links
 Delaware profile

1955 births
Living people
American football running backs
Arkansas Razorbacks football coaches
Arizona Cardinals coaches
Buffalo Bulls football coaches
Cincinnati Bengals coaches
Delaware Fightin' Blue Hens football coaches
Florida A&M Rattlers football coaches
Iowa Hawkeyes football players
James Madison Dukes football coaches
Kent State Golden Flashes football coaches
Miami Hurricanes football coaches
Miami RedHawks football coaches
Minnesota Vikings coaches
National Football League offensive coordinators
Southern Illinois Salukis football coaches
Southern Jaguars football coaches
Wake Forest Demon Deacons football coaches
Washington State Cougars football coaches
Wyoming Cowboys football coaches
Sportspeople from Massillon, Ohio
Coaches of American football from Ohio
Players of American football from Ohio
African-American coaches of American football
African-American players of American football
20th-century African-American sportspeople
21st-century African-American sportspeople